Hinton is both a surname and a given name. Notable people with the name include:

Surname
Alan Hinton (born 1942), British soccer player, coach, and broadcaster
Algia Mae Hinton (1929–2018), American singer
Alistair Hinton (born 1950), Scottish composer
Amir Hinton (born 1997), American basketball player
Arthur Hinton, (1869-1941) English composer
Carma Hinton, Chinese documentary filmmaker, daughter of William Hinton
Charles Howard Hinton (1853–1907), British mathematician and science fiction author, coiner of the word "tesseract"
Christopher Hinton (disambiguation), several people
Craig Hinton, British writer who authored several Doctor Who novels
Darby Hinton (born 1957), American actor
Deane R. Hinton (1923–2017), American diplomat
Denis Hinton (born 1939), Australian politician
Ed Hinton (sportswriter) (born 1948), American motor racing sportswriter
Ed Hinton (actor) (1919–1958), American actor
Eddie Hinton (1944–1995), American songwriter and session musician
Eddie Hinton (American football) (born 1947), American football player
Geoffrey Hinton (born 1947), British-Canadian computer scientist
Howard Hinton (art patron) (1867–1948), Australian art patron and benefactor
Howard Hinton (1912–1977), British entomologist
Jack Hinton (1909–1997), New Zealand soldier and recipient of the Victoria Cross
James Hinton (disambiguation), several people
Joan Hinton, American nuclear physicist who lived in China after 1949
Joe Hinton (1929–1968), American soul singer
John Hinton (disambiguation), several people
J. M. Hinton (1923–2000), also known as Michael Hinton, Oxford philosopher, first modern proponent of disjunctive view of perception
Joseph Hinton (composer) (1862 – after 1909), British composer and organist
Kendall Hinton (born 1997), American football player
Kyle Hinton (born 1998), American football player
Leanne Hinton, American linguist
Marcus Hinton, American football player
Martin Hinton (1883–1961), English zoologist
Martin Hinton (judge), Justice of the Supreme Court of South Australia
Mary Hinton (academic), American academic
Mary Hilliard Hinton (1869–1961), American anti-suffragist and historian
Milt Hinton (1910–2000), American jazz double bassist
Nate Hinton (born 1999), American basketball player
Paula Hinton (1924–1996), English ballet dancer
Primrose Rupp Hinton (1889–1969), American journalist
Ronald Hinton (born 1972), American serial killer
S. E. Hinton (born 1948), American author of young adult novels
Tracey Hinton, Welsh athlete
William A. Hinton (politician), American politician
William Augustus Hinton, American bacteriologist, first African American professor at Harvard
William H. Hinton (1919–2004), American Marxist who chronicled the Chinese Revolution, most notably in his work Fanshen

Given name
Hinton Battle, American actor, dancer, and dance teacher
Hinton James, one-term US congressman
Hinton Rowan Helper (1829–1909), American anti-slavery writer
Arthur Hinton Rosenfeld (1926-2017), American physicist